The Arado S I was a biplane trainer built in Germany in 1925. The first of three prototypes was powered by a Bristol Lucifer radial engine, while the other two Arado S.Ia aircraft were fitted with the Siemens-Halske Sh 12. The Siemens-Halske Sh 11 powered the Arado S III, a virtually identical aircraft of which only a single prototype was constructed and sold to Turkey.

Specifications (S III)

References

Further reading
 
 World Aircraft Information Files. Brightstar Publishing, London. File 889 Sheet 73

Sesquiplanes
Single-engined tractor aircraft
1920s German civil trainer aircraft
S I